This is a list of Dutch television related events from 1962.

Events
27 February - De Spelbrekers are selected to represent Netherlands at the 1962 Eurovision Song Contest with their song "Katinka". They are selected to be the seventh Dutch Eurovision entry during Nationaal Songfestival held at Concordia Theatre in Bussum.

Debuts

Television shows

1950s
NOS Journaal (1956–present)
Pipo de Clown (1958-1980)

Ending this year

Births
26 March - Paul de Leeuw, singer, comedian & actor
22 July - Cornald Maas, TV presenter
29 October - Myrna Goossen, TV & radio presenter

Deaths